The following is a list of media in Bismarck, North Dakota, United States:

Print
The only daily newspaper in Bismarck is the Bismarck Tribune.  The paper was established in 1873 and is the oldest continuing business in the city. The Tribune is the official newspaper of the city of Bismarck, Burleigh County, and the state of North Dakota. The daily newspapers of other major cities in North Dakota are also available at area newsstands.

Television

Over the air
There are five television stations based in Bismarck, and all of them have rebroadcasters in Minot, Williston, and Dickinson. The stations include:

Cable television
These are locally produced cable television stations carried on the Midcontinent Communications cable system in Bismarck:

Radio
Bismarck is home to a number of radio stations. All of the commercial stations are owned by either Clear Channel Communications or Townsquare Media. Many of the lower frequency stations are broadcasters of national Christian radio networks. The local stations include:

FM Frequencies
KBMK 88.3 FM (Contemporary Christian music) K-Love network affiliate
K204FG 88.7 FM (Christian) BBN translator
KLBF 89.1 FM (Contemporary Christian music) K-Love affiliate for nearby Lincoln
KNRI 89.7 FM (Christian rock) Air 1 affiliate
KCND 90.5 FM (Public Radio) Prairie Public
K216FK 91.1 FM (Spanish-language Christian) La Nueva Radio Cristiana Translator
KXRP 91.3 FM (Christian) American Family Radio affiliate
KYYY 92.9 FM (Top 40/CHR) "Y93"
KBEP-LP 93.7 FM (Christian) 3ABN affiliate
KQDY 94.5 FM (Country) "KQ 94.5"
KBYZ 96.5 FM (Classic rock) "The Walleye"
KKCT 97.5 FM (Top 40/CHR) "Hot 97-5"
KACL 98.7 FM (Classic Hits) "Cool 98.7"
K259AF 99.7 FM (News/Talk/Sports) KFYR-AM translator "K-Fire"
KLBE-LP 100.7 FM (Christian rock) "Club Radio"
KSSS 101.5 FM (Active rock) "Rock 101"
KUSB 103.3 FM (Country) "US 103.3"
KNDR 104.7 FM (Contemporary Christian music)
KKBO 105.9 FM (Country) "105.9 The Big Rig"
KJIT-LP 106.7 FM (Contemporary Christian music) Radio 74 Internationale affiliate
KXRV 107.5 (Classic Hits) "Mojo 107.5"

AM Frequencies
KFYR 550 AM (News/Talk/Sports/Oldies/Classic Hits/Top 40/CHR) "K-Fire 550"
KXMR 710 AM (Sports) "ESPN 710"
KBMR 1130 AM (Classic country) "Bismarck's original country station"
KLXX 1270 AM (Talk)
KDKT 1410 AM (Sports) "Fox Sports Radio 1410"
WQDL503 1610 AM (Traveler's Information Station), North Dakota Department of Transportation

See also
List of television stations in North Dakota

References

External links
Community Access Television website

Bismarck-Mandan
Bismarck–Mandan
Bismarck
North Dakota-related lists